was a 9-dan professional Go player, affiliated with the Nihon Ki-in, who lived in Japan. He was a student of Nobuaki Maeda.

Promotion record

This is a list of pupils who have been taught by Yusuke Oeda in the game of Go.

Ryu Shikun (from 1986)
Kana Mannami
Yasutoshi Yasuda  (from 1977)
Morito Oubuchi (from 1983)
Yo Kagen (from 1982)
Michael Redmond (from 1977)
Yasuhiko Onda (from 1982)
Yo Kaei (from 1984)
Hideichiro Iguchi (from 1977)
Yoshifumi Endo
Zenki Han
Ryutaro Miyazaki
Shimako Miyazaki
Masanori Kurotaki
Masaki Kurotaki
Gensho Shimoji
David Mechner

References

External links
 GoBase profile
 Nihon Ki-in profile 
 Sensei's Library profile

1935 births
Japanese Go players
2010 deaths
Sportspeople from Tokyo